Laura Garza is an American socialist politician, a garment worker and a member of UNITE HERE Local 187.

Garza ran twice for public office in Florida; 1993 for Mayor of Miami, and 1994 for United States House of Representatives in Florida's 21st congressional district. Both efforts were unsuccessful.

Garza ran as the Socialist Workers Party (SWP) candidate for Vice President in 1996.  She and running mate James Harris received 8,463 votes.

Garza has been an unsuccessful candidate for Boston City Council three times; 2003 and 2005 as an at-large candidate, and 2009 as a candidate for the District 1 seat.

Garza was the 2006 SWP candidate for the United States House of Representatives in Massachusetts's 8th congressional district, which includes Cambridge, Chelsea, Somerville and about three quarters of Boston.  She was the sole challenger to Democratic incumbent Mike Capuano, to whom she lost, receiving 12,390 votes, 9% of the total.

References

Further reading
 Ted Leonard, "Socialist candidates in Massachusetts: U.S. hands off Cuba!", The Militant 70(33), 4 September 2006.
 James Harris and Laura Garza, "'Anti-Terrorist' Measures Aimed At Working Class", The Militant 69(20), 19 August 1996.

External links
 Garza election records at ourcampaigns.com

Year of birth missing (living people)
Living people
UNITE HERE
Women in Massachusetts politics
Socialist Workers Party (United States) vice presidential nominees
Female candidates for Vice President of the United States
1996 United States vice-presidential candidates
20th-century American politicians
Trade unionists from Massachusetts
20th-century American women politicians
21st-century American women